Lissachatina glutinosa, common name the  African land snail, is a species of air-breathing land snail, a terrestrial pulmonate gastropod mollusk in the family Achatinidae, the giant African snails.

Description

Distribution
This species is found in Tanzania, Malawi, Mozambique, Ethiopia and Zimbabwe.

References

 Martens, E. von. (1860). Verzeichniss der von Prof. Peters in Mossambique gesammelten Land- und Süsswasser-Mollusken. Malakozoologische Blätter, 6[1859]: 211-221.

External links
 Pfeiffer, L. (1854). Description of eighteen new species of land shells, from the collection of H. Cuming, Esq. Proceedings of the Zoological Society of London. 20(243) [“1852”: 83–87. London]
 [https://www.biodiversitylibrary.org/page/11841320 

Achatinidae
Gastropods described in 1853